Martyrium is the first recorded and second released studio album by the Norwegian unblack metal band Antestor. It is one of the earliest Christian extreme metal albums released in Norway. Recorded in 1994, Martyrium was not immediately released, though bootleg copies of the album were printed in 1997 by Morphine Records. It then gained a cult following among a small audience until it was officially released in the year 2000 by Endtime Productions.

Recording history
Originally Torodd Fuglesteg, head of the infamous Arctic Serenades label, sent Antestor to studio to record Martyrium. At the time having problems with signing the band Groms for Arctic Serenades' roster, Fuglesteg said: "I was also in touch with Antestor at that time and I sent them into studio to do their Martyrium album. This album was later released through another label. I regarded, and still regard, Antestor as much darker than Groms, which was a happy-smiles band." Martyrium was recorded at Norsk Lydskole in December 1994, remixed in February 1995, and was produced by Jon Ove Andersen and Antestor. Some problems occurred and in 1997, another label called Morphine Records ended up releasing only 50 bootleg copies of the album. However, tape copies circulated in up to fifth generation copies and their audience grew fast. Michael Bryzak writes in the liner notes of The Defeat of Satan / Despair compilation album (2003) that, although the first album was not officially released until 2000, "Martyrium was rightfully considered a cult classic."

In 1999, Antestor began collaborating with the Swedish label Endtime Productions, and the label released Martyrium the following year. The cover art was changed to a painting by Kristian Wåhlin.

Overview

Musically, Martyrium leans toward a combination of death metal, doom metal and black metal. The guitar playing emphasizes on tremolo riffs, and sometimes on slow doom metal riffs; the drumming ranges from down-tempo to mid-paced arrangements. Martyr's (Kjetil Molnes) vocals are mostly guttural, blackened death grunts and sometimes higher growls. Several songs showcase progressive elements: "Depressed" begins with a grand piano solo followed by "orthodoxly sung funeral dirge." "Thoughts" begins with a 2-minute funeral mass organ solo, before the blackened death/doom output turns in. The song "Mercy Lord" showcases operatic, uncredited female vocals and cites the Psalm 51. "Searching" was featured on Cross Rhythms Music's Extreme Music Sampler volume 4 compilation album. "Mercy Lord", "Thoughts", and "Inmost Fear" were also featured on Rowe Production's compilation album Northern Lights: Norwegian Metal Compilation in 1996.

Jamie Lee Rake of HM Magazine wrote of the Endtime Productions re-release of Martyrium, suspecting that the progressive elements of the album made the band unnoticed innovators in the early Norwegian extreme metal scene:

Track listing
All songs by Antestor.
 "Spiritual Disease" – 6:42 
 "Materialistic Lie" – 3:13
 "Depressed" – 6:43
 "Searching" – 3:00
 "Inmost Fear" – 5:38
 "Under the Sun" – 5:00
 "Thoughts" – 7:09
 "Martyrium" – 2:59  
 "Mercy Lord" – 6:40

Personnel
Antestor
Vegard Undal (Gard) - bass guitar
Svein Sander (Armoth) - drums
Kjetil Molnes (Martyr) - vocals
Lars Stokstad (Vemod) - guitars, keyboards, backing vocals, mixing
Erling Jorgensen (Pilgrim) - guitars, booklet photography

Additional personnel
Kristian Wåhlin - cover artwork
Malling - logo artwork
Samuel Durling - executive producing 
Göran Finnberg - mastering
Jon Ove Andersen - producing, engineering
Tora - additional female vocals

References

2000 albums
Antestor albums
Albums with cover art by Kristian Wåhlin
Death-doom albums
Death metal albums by Norwegian artists
Doom metal albums by Norwegian artists